The AllerWeltHaus Hagen ("All the world house Hagen"); commonly shortened to AWH; is a Cultural center in the Dr. Ferdinand David Park in Hagen. It is located next to the Potthofstraße in Hagens downtown area, near the central Synagogue.

Facilities

It houses a Fair Trade Shop and a Coffeehouse called Café Bistro Mundial, offering a changing vegetarian-vegan menu of the day from Monday to Friday. A Cultural & Educational Center can also be found in the AllerWeltHaus: Its  regular cultural program, cultural projects and workshops with artists from all over the world contribute to build bridges and to arouse curiosity about cultural vitality, with lectures, exhibitions and seminars providing in-depth information on current development issues.

Numerous collaborations with schools and News media are intended to contribute to broad social consensus on the issues of "sustainable development".

The AllerWeltHaus Hagen e.V.
The AllerWeltHaus and its institutions are run by the AllerWeltHaus Hagen Association, which purpose according to its mission statement is "to promote an international attitude, international understanding and care for those being persecuted for political, racial or religious reasons, especially in the area of youth welfare.The association is committed to a peaceful, just and ecologically sound development.It opposes all inhumane and racist endeavors.

It is realizing its objectives through: The implementation of international education and cultural events with a focus on the Southern Hemisphere; Maintaining an intercultural meeting place, and support for projects that contribute social and charitable or comparable organizations, or that serve the care for the persecuted.

History

The free cultural center AllerWeltHaus Hagen was formed in 1988 in continuation of the  Third World Shop Hagen existing since 1976.

The Center as venue
Different local initiatives meet in the AWH, among them:Friedensinitiative Hagen, Terre des hommes Hagen, German-French Society, Fotofreunde Hagen, Hagen Vegan Association.

Exhibitions
There are regular exhibitions of Art and Photography in the Center.

Management 

Presidents of the Executive Board of the AllerWeltHaus Hagen e.V.

 Martin Pietschik (2014)

Public transport
 Hagen Hauptbahnhof can be reached in 12 minutes by feet.

References

External links

 Official website

Buildings and structures in Hagen
Cultural centers
Community centres
Cultural organisations based in Germany
Event venues established in 1976
1976 establishments in West Germany
Buildings and structures completed in 1988